M.Perumalpalayam is a village in the Vazhapadi taluk of Salem district, in Tamil Nadu, India.

Geography
M.Perumalpalayam is within Vazhapadi taluk, which is in the central part of Salem district. The only railway in Vazhapadi taluk runs through the village, and National Highway 79 passes to its south.

Demographics
In 2011 M.Perumalpalayam had a population of 5,232 people living in 1,360 households. The numbers of male and female inhabitants were almost equal, with 2,615 male and 2,617 female residents. 509 children in the town, about 10% of the population, were at or below the age of 6. The literacy rate in the town was 57.5%. Scheduled Castes and Scheduled Tribes accounted for 65.4% and 0.05% of the population, respectively.

References

Villages in Salem district
Villages in Vazhapadi taluk